Cirrhochrista grabczewskyi is a moth of the family Crambidae. It is found in subtropical Africa from Senegal to Kenya, and is also known from Zimbabwe and South Africa.

It has a wingspan of 24–30 mm.

See also
Original description: Hering, Ed. 1903,  "Neue Pyraliden aus dem tropischen Faunengebiet". Entomologische Zeitung 64 (1) p. 109, Stettin. via Internet Archive.

References

Moths described in 1907
Spilomelinae
Lepidoptera of West Africa
Moths of Africa